Thomas Gerald Stanford (1924 – 2017) was an American film and television editor with about sixteen feature film credits. He won the Academy Award for Best Film Editing at the 34th Academy Awards for the film West Side Story (1961), which was only his second credit as an editor. Long afterwards, West Side Story was listed as the 38th best-edited film of all time in a 2012 survey of members of the Motion Picture Editors Guild. The film's editing is also featured in Louis Giannetti's textbook Understanding Movies.

Stanford's first credit as an editor was for Suddenly, Last Summer (1959), which was a major production by the independent producer Sam Spiegel. Excepting a 1955 film version of the opera Don Giovanni, any earlier work as an assistant editor wasn't credited. This was typical in the 1950s. Stanford edited three films with director Sydney Pollack, including Pollack's first feature The Slender Thread (1964). Stanford's work on Pollack's feature Jeremiah Johnson (1972) drew the attention of critic Gene Siskel, who wrote "Oddly enough, it is the violent scenes, the ones that don't work within the story, in which Pollack excels. Jeremiah's battle with a pack of wolves, and, later, a pack of Crow Indians, are stunning examples of direction and editing." In the 1960s, Stanford edited two films directed by Mark Rydell, including his debut The Fox (1967). Stanford's last film before his retirement was Born to Race (1988).

Stanford died at the age of 93 in 2017.

Filmography
This filmography is based on the listing at the Internet Movie Database.
Born to Race (1988)
Split Decisions (1988)
Saving Grace (1986) (additional editor)
The Legend of the Lone Ranger (1981)
Before and After (1979)
Sergeant Matlovich vs. the U.S. Air Force (1978)
Mad Bull (1977)
The Yanks Are Coming (1974)
The Yakuza (1974)
Jeremiah Johnson (1972)
The Steagle (1971)
The Reivers (1969)
Hell in the Pacific (1968)
Don't Make Waves (1967)
The Fox (1967)
The Slender Thread (1965)
The Truth About Spring (1965)
Emil and the Detectives (1964) (was later edited to Walt Disney's Wonderful World of Color as a 2-part in 1966)
In the Cool of the Day (1963)
West Side Story (1961)
Suddenly, Last Summer (1959)

References

External links

  Thomas Stanford (née Schloss)

1924 births
2017 deaths
American film editors
Best Film Editing Academy Award winners
USC School of Cinematic Arts faculty
Film people from Düsseldorf